Jennifer Mary Anderson (born May 28, 1959) is an Associate Judge on the Superior Court of the District of Columbia.

Education and career 
Anderson earned her Bachelor of Arts, magna cum laude, from Mount St. Mary's College in 1981, and her Juris Doctor from Columbus School of Law for the Catholic University of America in 1984.

After graduating, she joined Cadwalader, Wickersham & Taft as an associate. In 1991 she became an assistant at the U.S. Attorney's Office in the District of Columbia.

D.C. Superior Court 
On November 16, 2004, President George W. Bush nominated her to be an associate judge of the Superior Court of the District of Columbia. Her nomination expired on December 8, 2004, with the end of the 108th United States Congress.

President George W. Bush renominated her on February 14, 2005, to a 15-year term as an associate judge of the Superior Court of the District of Columbia to the seat vacated by Steffen W. Graae. On July 11, 2006, the Senate Committee on Homeland Security and Governmental Affairs held a hearing on her nomination. On July 27, 2006, the committee reported her nomination favorably to the senate floor. On August 3, 2006, the full Senate confirmed her nomination by voice vote. She was sworn in on October 27, 2006.

Personal life 
Anderson was born in Dublin, Ireland; her family later immigrated in 1967 to the United States and settled in Baltimore, Maryland.

References

1959 births
Living people
21st-century American judges
21st-century American women judges
Columbus School of Law alumni
Irish emigrants to the United States
Judges of the Superior Court of the District of Columbia
Mount St. Mary's University (Los Angeles) alumni
People from Baltimore